Silchar - Bhairabi Passenger is a Passenger express train of the Indian Railways connecting Silchar in Assam and  Bairabi in Mizoram. It is currently being operated with 55667/55668 train numbers on a daily basis. Bairabi is only the railhead of Mizoram and connected with a broad gauge line.

Service

The 55667/Silchar - Bhairabi Passenger has an average speed of 25 km/hr and covers 103 km in 4 hrs 15 mins. 55668/Bhairabi - Silchar Passenger has an average speed of 25 km/hr and covers 56 km in 4 hrs 10 mins.

Route and halts

Traction 
The train is hauled by a Siliguri Loco Shed based WDP-4 diesel locomotive.

Coach composite

The train consist of 12 coaches :

 10- General
 2 Second-class Luggage/parcel van

Direction Reversal

Train Reverses its direction 1 times:

 Katakhal Junction

Rake Maintenance 

The train is maintained by the Silchar Coaching Depot. The same rake is used for Silchar - Vangaichangpo Passenger.

See also 

 Silchar railway station
 Bairabi railway station
 Silchar - Jiribam Passenger
 Bairabi Sairang Railway

References

External links 

 55667/Silchar - Bhairabi Passenger
 55668/Bhairabi - Silchar Passenger
 Indian Railway Website

Rail transport in Mizoram
Rail transport in Assam
Slow and fast passenger trains in India
Railway services introduced in 2016
2016 establishments in Assam
Transport in Silchar
2016 establishments in Mizoram